Bethanie Mattek-Sands and Nadia Petrova were the defending champions; however, they chose not to compete this year.

Seeds

Draw

Draw

References
Main Draw

Porsche Tennis Grand Prix - Doubles
Porsche Tennis Grand Prix